Trạng Quỳnh was an official under the famous Vietnamese historical period of King Le - Trinh Lord. His character may have inspired the 1930s Vietnamese cartoon satire of Xã Xệ and Lý Toét.

Content
Quynh is also made as a cunning character from traditional Vietnamese folk tales.

References

Vietnamese literary characters